Elon Musk is a South-African American entrepreneur and business magnate who has made numerous cameo appearances in films and television shows as himself. These appearances include Iron Man 2, The Simpsons, South Park, The Big Bang Theory, and Rick and Morty. He has also made appearances in many documentary films.

Films

Television

Documentaries

References

Elon Musk
Male actor filmographies
American filmographies